A constitutional referendum was held in Burkina Faso on 9 June 1991. It followed the 1987 military coup, and would restore multi-party democracy. The new constitution retained the presidential system of government, created a bicameral parliament, and limited the President to two seven-year terms. It was approved by 92.83% of voters with a 48.8% turnout.

Results

References

1991
1991 referendums
1991 in Burkina Faso
Constitutional referendums